Milltown (meaning "town of the mill") is a village in County Kildare, Ireland. The village is in the townland of the same name in the civil parish of Feighcullen It is 7km from the town of Newbridge. It is on the R415 regional road between Allenwood and Crookstown.

Demographics
In the 2002 Census, the village had a population of 271, by 2006 this had shrunk by 10.7% to 242. At the 2016 Census, the population of Milltown village was 344.

Churches 
Milltown is part of the Allen Parish. The Church of St Brigid is located in Milltown. The present Church of St Brigid was built in 1817. An inserted tablet records -A Chapel of ease was erected here in 1817 by Rev. John Lawler P.P. and the subscription of the faithful. It was renovated and reroofed in 1961. The Rev. John Lawlor who erected the Church, was Parish Priest of Allen 1802 to 1830. He was a native of Morristown in the parish of Monasterevan. A portion of the east gable of an older chapel of the penal times still stands near the modern church. An even older church at Milltown or Ballymuillen is mentioned again in Dr McGeoghegan’s list of churches. The Church of St Brigid underwent major renovation in 2007/08.

People
 Moll Anthony is buried in the graveyard.
 Damien Leith was raised in Milltown.

Sport
Milltown is home to Milltown GAA, which was founded in 1888.

References

External links
 http://www.allenparish.ie/churches
 
 https://web.archive.org/web/20070930013113/http://www.cso.ie/census/documents/census2006_Table_7_and_12.pdf

Gallery

Towns and villages in County Kildare
Townlands of County Kildare